The First Judicial District is the judicial body governing the county of Philadelphia, Pennsylvania, United States. It consists of the Court of Common Pleas of Philadelphia County and the Philadelphia Municipal Court.

Although the title of the district is assigned by the Pennsylvania Unified Court System, the court operates under the county of Philadelphia. All judges serving on the bench are elected to serve their terms by registered voters in Philadelphia, rather than appointed by the executive branch of government.  The First Judicial District's respective courts preside over all state and local jurisdiction civil and criminal matters that occur within the county of Philadelphia's borders.

Court of Common Pleas
The Court of Common Pleas is led by a President Judge and Administrative Judges, Common Pleas is further broken down into three divisions: trial, family and orphans' court division.

As of March 2019, the President Judge of the Court of Common Pleas is the Honorable Idee Fox, and the current trial division Administrative Judge is the Honorable Jacqueline F. Allen. There are 70 commissioned judges in the trial division, supplemented by senior judges.  Of the commissioned judges, 41 sit in the criminal section of trial division and 29 sit in the civil section of the trial division. The civil and criminal sections each have their own supervising judge (being, respectively, the Honorable Arnold New and the Honorable Leon Tucker as of March 2019).  

The family division is broken down into the Juvenile Branch and Domestic Relations, and has 25 assigned judges. The family division has its own Administrative Judge and Supervising Judge (being the Honorable Margaret T. Murphy and the Honorable Walter J. Olszewksi as of March 2019).  As of March 2019, there are four judges assigned to the Orphan's Court Division, including its own Administrative Judge (the Honorable Matthew D. Carrafiello).  

Through a 1999 Order of then Administrative Judge John Herron, the Commerce Case Management Program was created within the trial division's civil section, effective January 1, 2000. The program is generally known as the Commerce Court. It is a specialized Business Court hearing only business and commercial cases that fall within specifically defined categories. There are three assigned civil section judges who exclusively hear Commerce Court cases, one of whom serves as the Commerce Court's Supervising Judge (the Honorable Gary Glazer as of March 2019).  The Commerce Court has three case tracks: (1) Expedited (trial in 13 months); (2) Standard (trial in 18 months); and Complex (trial in 24 months). 

Since the Commerce Court's inception, its design has required that opposing counsel, and often the litigants themselves, participate in mandatory settlement conferences facilitated by Judges Pro Tempore (JPTs).  These JPTs are not judges, but seasoned commercial and business lawyers with training or experience as mediators and neutrals. The Commerce Court or the Philadelphia Bar Association’s Business Law Section, Business Litigation Committee can nominate JPTs. The Commerce Court has also posted over 1,000 judicial opinions on its website since 2000. In providing guidance to litigants and their lawyers, the Commerce Court makes these opinions searchable by topic as well.

The trial division holds all criminal proceedings, as well as proceedings for civil matters where more than $10,000 is being challenged. The family division is discharged with resolving domestic relations and juvenile cases. The orphans' court is responsible for processing and resolving disputes of, trusts, wills, and estates. The Adult probation and parole services for Philadelphia are under the jurisdiction of the Common Pleas court. The Intake and Interstate Units are located in the Basement of the Criminal Justice Center, while all other units are located at 714 Market Street.

Criminal dockets would be CP-51-CR-*****-2007. CP denotes the court, in this case, Common Pleas.  51 is the county code, in this case Philadelphia County. CR denotes the type of case, criminal.  The * represents the case number and the last four digits are the year the case was created.

Municipal Court
All criminal cases in Philadelphia initially go through Philadelphia Municipal Court, with 27 judges.  The Municipal Court maintains jurisdiction over criminal cases where the maximum punishment possible for an offender is less than five years imprisonment. The Municipal Court's traffic division handles all traffic court matters arising within City limits. The Municipal Court also has jurisdiction over civil cases with an amount in controversy less than $12,000 (or $12,500 for fines and most debts owed to the City of Philadelphia, or $15,000 for delinquent real-estate taxes owed to the City and certain tax debts owed to the School District of Philadelphia). The civil division of the Municipal Court also has jurisdiction over all landlord-tenant disputes, residential or commercial, irrespective of the amount in controversy.

Appeals from the Municipal Court remain within the First Judicial District by becoming a matter of the Court of Common Pleas. Philadelphia is one of two counties in Pennsylvania that has a Municipal Court (the other being Pittsburgh). Criminal dockets would be MC-51-CR-*****-2007.

Summary offenses are heard in Community Court, the usual punishment from a summary offense is a small fine and/or community service. The summary dockets would be MC-51-SU-*****-2007.

See also

Criminal Justice Center (Philadelphia)

References

External links
First Judicial District
Pennsylvania's Counties and Judicial Districts - A comprehensive list of each county in Pennsylvania, their corresponding district number, and county number

Government of Philadelphia
Philadelphia
Judicial districts